Melanolepsis multiglandulosa is a plant species of the family Euphorbiaceae, first described in 1826. It is native to Nansei-shoto, Mariana Islands, Solomon Islands, Bismarck Archipelago, New Guinea, Maluku, Sulawesi, Philippines, Lesser Sunda Islands, Java, Sumatra, Borneo, Thailand, Malaysia and Taiwan.

References

Chrozophoreae
Flora of Thailand
Flora of Malesia
Flora of Papuasia
Flora of Taiwan
Flora of the Northern Mariana Islands
Plants described in 1826
Taxa named by Caspar Georg Carl Reinwardt
Taxa named by Carl Ludwig Blume
Taxa named by Heinrich Gustav Reichenbach
Taxa named by Heinrich Zollinger
Flora without expected TNC conservation status